Balawas is a village in Hisar-1 Rural Development Block, Nalwa Chaudhry (Vidhan Sabha constituency) and Hisar (Lok Sabha constituency) of Hisar District of Hisar Division in the Haryana state of India.

Description 
Balawas is located at Hisar-Tosham road. People of all castes live in Balawas. Balawas village has government middle school. Main occupation of people is agriculture and government/private jobs. Balawas is connected to nearby villages through the road network with presence of State Transport Service and private bus services which link it to Hisar, Hansi, Tosham and Bhiwani.

History
After Independence of India in 1947, it became part of Punjab. Once Haryana was formed as a separate state in 1966, it became part of the Hisar district, state of Haryana State.

Transportation

Road
It is well-connected by the Matelled Asphalt (paved bitumen) road with Hisar (city) 24 km.

Train connectivity
The village does not have a rail station.

Airport connectivity
There are no commercial domestic or international flights from this airport.

Revenue, agriculture, health and other services
There is a Patwari (Government Land Records Officer), an Agriculture Development Officer (ADO), a Rural Health Officer, and an Anganwadi (Community Childcare) worker based at village.

Jan Sahayak e-governance services
Government of Haryana services are accessible via their Official website.

Government of India e-governance services can be availed online at their website for various  govt departments including land & revenue (land rights and ownership records), transport (driving license and vehicle registration), health (birth and death certificates), public health (water and sewer connection), food (ration cards), power (electricity connection) and HUDA or Municipal Committee/council (house tax and building plans).

See also

 Bidhwan
 Badya Jattan
 Badyan Brahmnan
 Kanwari

References

External links
 Google location map

Cities and towns in Hisar district
Villages in Hisar district